Asrenda is a village in Hilauli block of Unnao district, Uttar Pradesh, India. As of 2011, its population is 4,475, in 782 households, and it has 2 primary schools and no healthcare facilities.

The 1961 census recorded Asrenda as comprising 3 hamlets, with a total population of 2,047 (1,053 male and 994 female), in 355 households and 306 physical houses. The area of the village was given as 1,551 acres.

References

Villages in Unnao district